Poovankery Francis Mathew is an Indian author of Malayalam literature and a screenplay writer in Malayalam film and Television industries. A Winner of a National Film Award for Best Screenplay and multiple State television and other literary awards including the Kerala Sahitya Akademi Award for Novel, he is known for his original style of writing. Literary works such as Muzhakkam, Kadalinte Manam, Adiyalapretham, Iruttil Oru Punyalan,  and Chaavunilam and screenplays such as Sararaanthal, Mikhayelinte Santhathikal, Megham, Kutty Srank and Ee.Ma.Yau  are his major works.

Early years
Mathews was born in a Latin Christian family on 18 February 1960 in Ernakulam, Kerala to Poovankery Francis and Mary Francis. After his early schooling in Don Bosco School and St. Augustine's School, Kochi, he graduated in economics from St. Albert's College Kochi, in 1980 and secured his master's degree in Malayalam in 1982. He started writing at the age of 10 when he used to write and direct one- act plays. He took to short stories at the age of 16 and his short stories have been published in leading Malayalam publications like Malayala Manorama, Kalakaumudi, Mathrubhumi, Madhyamam and Bhashaposhini. He spent his regular career at Advocate General's Office of the High Court of Kerala from where he superannuated in 2016.

Literary career
His first short story anthology, Njayarazhcha Mazha Peyyukayayirunnu (It Was Raining on Sunday), was published in 1986 by Current Books. His second work was a novel, Chaavunilam (Land of the Dead), based on the coastal life in Kochi and published in 1996 by DC Books, which won the State Bank of Travancore award for the best novel. Subsequent years produced two more short story collections, Jalakanyakayum Gandarvanum (the Mermaid and the Celestial Lover) and 2004il Alice (Alice in 2004). In 2013, a short story anthology, Kathakal (Stories), and his memoirs, Theerajeevithathinu Oru Oppees (A Requiem for the Coastal Life), were published. His second novel, Iruttil Oru Punyalan (A Saint Shrouded in Darkness), was published in 2015, and two of its chapters were published by Mathrubhumi weekly, prior to the official release of the book. The book has since been translated into Tamil, under the title, Iruttil Oru Punithan, by P. S. Ramesh.

Film and television career
Mathews debuted into screen writing with a documentary film, Keep the City Clean. In 1991, he won the Kerala State Television Award for screen play, for the tele-series Sararaanthal (The Lantern), broadcast in Doordarshan. He received his second state television award for Mikhayelinte Santhathikal (Descendants of Mikhayel), in 1993. Several works followed, which included Dr. Harischandra (1994), Roses in December (1995), Charulatha (1999), Aathma (2000), Edayanum Mankidavum (2003), Megham (2004), Mantharam (2005), Aa Amma (2006), Pakalmazha (2009) and Daivathinu Swantham Devootti (2012), the last one winning State television award for the best Series. He has also won the script writing competition held nationwide by National Film Development Corporation of India, for Naattukaaryam, in 1993.

Mathews' foray into big screen was in 1986 with the story of Thanthram (the Plot), a Mammooty starrer. This was followed by Puthran (the Son), a sequel to the successful tele series, Mikhayelinte Santhathikal. The next was Kutty Srank, directed by Shaji N. Karun, which won him the National Film Award for Best Screenplay for the year 2010. Antichrist, a Lijo Jose Pellissery project, with Prithviraj, Fahadh Faasil and Indrajith in lead roles, was put on hold after initial discussions. The next project, Ee.Ma.Yau, a Lijo Jose Pellissery film, was released in May 2018 and the film received good critical reviews. Another Lijo Jose Pellissery film has also been announced, with Mamootty in the lead role.

Mathews also sat in the jury panel of the Kerala State Film Awards for the year 2016.

Personal life
Mathews, a recipient of the KCBC Yuvaprathibha (Young Talent) award (1999), is married to Shobha and the couple has two sons, Unni Mathews and Anand Mathews, both of whom are part of the 'Karikku' team. He has been employed with the Advocate General's Office, Ernakulam, and has since superannuated from service.

Awards and recognitions

Literary works

Tele-series and Documentaries

Filmography

See also
 List of Indian writers

References

Further reading

External links
 
 
 
 
 
 

 
 

Malayalam screenwriters
Screenwriters from Kochi
Malayalam novelists
Malayalam-language writers
1960 births
Indian male novelists
Indian male short story writers
Living people
Don Bosco schools alumni
University of Kerala alumni
20th-century Indian short story writers
20th-century Indian novelists
21st-century Indian novelists
21st-century Indian short story writers
Indian male screenwriters
Indian television writers
Novelists from Kerala
20th-century Indian male writers
21st-century Indian male writers
Best Original Screenplay National Film Award winners
Male television writers